The Texas Public Policy Foundation (TPPF) is a conservative think tank based in Austin, Texas. The organization was founded in 1989 by James R. Leininger, who sought intellectual support for his education reform ideas, including public school vouchers. Projects of the organization include Right on Crime, which is focused on criminal justice reform, and Fueling Freedom, which seeks to "explain the forgotten moral case for fossil fuels" by rejecting the scientific consensus on climate change.

History 
TPPF was initially founded and funded in 1989 by James R. Leininger, a physician, businessman and conservative activist from San Antonio, Texas. Leininger is notable for school voucher and privatization activism. The organization's board of directors includes thirteen individuals. Originally based in San Antonio, the organization was relocated in 2003 to Austin, Texas to be near the state capitol. In February 2015, TPPF moved into a new $20-million building two blocks from the Texas Capitol.

In 2010, TPPF received funding from Koch Industries as well as Geo Prison Group, a GEO Group company.

In January 2018, the organization announced that it had opened a new office in Washington, D.C. At the time, TPPF had more than 75 employees based in Texas; it announced plans to  increase its D.C.-based staff from 5 to as many as 15 employees in 2018 in order to expand the group's work in the areas of environmental and health care policy and criminal justice reform.

In February 2019, the organization hired former U.S. Representative John Hostettler, a Republican from Indiana, to lead its state-based policy efforts. The Texas Public Policy Foundation States Trust initiative promotes policy ideas aimed at increasing state's rights and decreasing the role of the federal government in areas including energy regulation, spending, and health care.

Funding
In 2015, TPPF had total revenue of $10.8 million. Donors to the organization include energy companies Chevron, ExxonMobil, and other fossil fuel interests. The stated mission of TPPF is "to promote and defend liberty, personal responsibility, and free enterprise in Texas and the nation by educating and affecting policymakers and the Texas public policy debate with academically sound research and outreach."

Organization and activities 
TPPF is organized into nine issue-area centers and a litigation arm.

During the year, TPPF hosts monthly policy events ("Policy Primers") covering a range of issues, and an annual conference ("Policy Orientation for the Texas Legislature"). The 2015 policy orientation included Steve Forbes, Newt Gingrich, and Phil Gramm. 

In 2013, TPPF published The Texas Model: Prosperity in the Lone Star State and Lessons for America. TPPF also publishes a quarterly journal titled Veritas.

Current U.S. Senator Ted Cruz formerly headed TPPF's Center for Tenth Amendment Studies.

The organization sponsors the Right on Crime initiative, an effort to reduce crime, restore victims, and replace mass incarceration with more cost-effective and humane sentencing and criminal punishment.

In October 2017, the White House announced that President Donald Trump had selected Kathleen Hartnett White to serve as chair of the Council on Environmental Quality. White is a fellow at TPPF. A climate change denier, White has said that climate change does not exist and that United Nations findings on climate change are "not validated and politically corrupt." She has argued that carbon dioxide levels are good for life on Earth, that carbon dioxide is not a pollutant, and that "fossil fuels dissolved the economic justification for slavery." In February 2018, the White House confirmed their intention to withdraw their nomination of Hartnett White as a senior advisor on environmental policy.

TPPF has been described by NPR as "an influential think tank that opposes efforts to fight climate change and receives millions of dollars from fossil fuel interests."

TPPF lobbied for the Texas legislature to ban the prescription of puberty blockers and hormone treatments for minors.

Notable staff 
 Chuck DeVore, vice president of national initiatives
 Talmadge L. Heflin, distinguished senior fellow 
 Joshua Treviño, chief of intelligence and research
 John Hostettler, vice president of federal affairs
 Ron Simmons, director of Right on Work
 Carol M. Swain, distinguished senior fellow
 Zach Whiting, senior fellow of technology policy

See also
State Policy Network

References

External links

 
 EDIRC listing (provided by RePEc)
 Organizational Profile – National Center for Charitable Statistics (Urban Institute)

Organizations based in Austin, Texas
Political and economic think tanks in the United States
1989 establishments in Texas
Conservative organizations in the United States
Climate change denial
Organizations established in 1989